The 1950 Sheffield Telegraph Trophy was a non-championship Formula One race in the 1950 season. It was won by its only finisher, Cuth Harrison. There was no qualifying session.

Classification

Race

References

Sheffield Telegraph Trophy
Sheffield Telegraph Trophy